Never You Mind is the first album by The New Amsterdams recorded in March/April 2000 at Z'gwonth Studios in Lawrence, Kansas and released September 19, 2000 on Vagrant Records and Heroes & Villains Records.

Background 
The record was released at a time when The Get Up Kids were becoming more and more successful. At this point, The New Amsterdams became an acoustic side project from The Get Up Kids.

"Slow Down" is a cover from the American punk/emo band Boilermaker from San Diego, California. "When We Two Parted" is a cover from the American alternative rock band The Afghan Whigs.

Track listing

Reception 
"The New Amsterdams' debut Never You Mind placates the frustration in a wispy, folk beauty for surely Pryor has tried to outdo himself this time… This is an honest record where the craftsmanship is perfectly stripped, not hushing like his emo predecessors, but certainly moving in a way where the simplicity still matters." – Allmusic

"People who liked songs like "Out of Reach" or "Valentine" from the last Get Up Kids album should definitely check this out. The songs are on the border between melancholy and euphoria." – Ox-Fanzine

Artwork 
During a Facebook Live video on March 23, 2020, Matt Pryor stated that the cover artwork is a portrait of Danny Pound from the band Vitreous Humor by artist Travis Millard.

Personnel 

 Matt Pryor – Vocals, Guitar, Producer
 James Dewees – Cello
 Ed Rose – Guitar-Solo on "Never Treat Others"
 Rob Pope – Producer
 Alex Brahl – Producer
 Andrew Ellis – Booking

References 

2000 debut albums
The New Amsterdams albums